Jeandre Labuschangne (born 17 July 1999) is a South African rugby union player for the  in the Currie Cup and . His regular position is lock or flanker.

Labuschange was named in the  side for the 2021 Currie Cup Premier Division. He made his debut for the  against the British & Irish Lions on 10 July in the 2021 British & Irish Lions tour to South Africa.

References

South African rugby union players
Living people
Rugby union locks
Rugby union flankers
Sharks (rugby union) players
Sharks (Currie Cup) players
1999 births
Cheetahs (rugby union) players
Rugby union players from KwaZulu-Natal